Penicillium ribium is a  psychrotolerant species of the genus of Penicillium which was isolated from the Rocky Mountains in Wyoming, in the United States. Penicillium ribium produces asperfuran, kojic acid and cycloaspeptide.

References

Further reading 
 
 

ribium
Fungi described in 2006